Greece competed at the 2019 European Games, in Minsk, Belarus from 21 to 30 June 2019.

Medalists

|width="30%" align=left valign=top|

Archery

Recurve

Men

Women

Mixed team

Athletics

Track events

Field events

Team event

Reserves:
Alexandros Peristeris
Michail Kiafas
Konstantinos Vasilakis
Korina Politi
Alanna Bern
Kyriaki Samani

Boxing

Men

Women

Canoeing

Men

Cycling

Road

Men

Women

Track

Madison

Endurance

Scratch

Points race

Omnium

Gymnastics

Artistic

Men

Women

Rhythmic

Trampoline

Men

Women

Judo

Men

Women

Karate

Women

Sambo

Men

Women

Shooting

Men

Women

Mixed team

Table tennis

Men

Women

Wrestling

Men's freestyle

Men's Greco-Roman

Women's freestyle

References

Nations at the 2019 European Games
European Games
2019